Joël Karekezi (born 12 December 1985) is a Rwandan screenwriter, film director and film producer. His short film The Pardon, about reconciliation after the Rwandan genocide against Tutsi in 1994, won the Golden Impala award at the Amakula Film Festival in Uganda. A feature version was made in 2011, and shown at the Göteborg International Film Festival, and later at other international film festivals including Seattle International Film Festival (2013), Chicago International Film Festival and FESPACO.

Life and education
Karekezi was born in Rubavu, Rwanda. His father died during the Rwanda genocide againt the Tutsi in 1994, after this event he took refuge in the Democratic Republic of the Congo (DRC) where he found one of his cousins.  He learnt screenwriting at the Maisha Film Lab in 2009; he holds a diploma in film directing from the Canadian online film school CineCours.

Career
After attending the Maisha Film Lab, Karekezi directed his short film The Pardon, which won The Golden Impala award at Amakula Film Festival in Uganda. In 2010 it was shown at the Durban International Film Festival, the Images That Matter Short Film Festival in Ethiopia, the Kenya International Film Festival, the Zanzibar International Film Festival and the Silicon Valley African Film Festival in California, where it won the Best Short Film award.

Karekezi made a feature version, Imbabazi: The Pardon, based on the same characters. It was made on a low budget and filmed in Uganda.

In 2013 Karekezi was working on "Mercy of the Jungle", which was presented in the Fabrique des cinemas du Monde at the Cannes Film Festival in 2013. The script of "Mercy of the Jungle" won the CFI Best Audiovisual Award for the most promising audiovisual project at the Durban FilmMart in 2012.

His other films include: Les jeunes à la poursuite du travail, 2009;Survivor, 2010; and Ntukazime Nararokotse, 2010.

Personal life
Karekezi is fluent in French.

Filmography

References

Living people
Rwandan film directors
1985 births
People from Rubavu District
Maisha Film Lab alumni